In the 2011 CONCACAF Gold Cup the main disciplinary action taken against players comes in the form of red and yellow cards.

Any player picking up a red card is expelled from the pitch and automatically banned for his country's next match, whether via a straight red or second yellow. After a straight red card, FIFA will conduct a hearing and may extend this ban beyond one match. If the ban extends beyond the end of the finals (i.e. if a player is sent off in the match in which his team was eliminated), it must be served in the team's next competitive international match(es).

Disciplinary statistics
 Total number of yellow cards: 90
 Average yellow cards per match: 3.60
 Total number of red cards: 10
 Average red cards per match: 0.24
 First yellow card: Marco Ureña – Costa Rica against Cuba
 First red card: Marvin González – El Salvador against Mexico
 Fastest yellow card from kick off: 2 minutes – David Cyrus – Grenada against Jamaica
 Fastest yellow card after coming on as substitute: 2 minutes – Henry Medina – Honduras against Guatemala
 Latest yellow card in a match without extra time: 90+3 minutes – Carlos Bocanegra – United States against Panama
 Fastest dismissal from kick off: 4 minutes – Jean-Luc Lambourde – Guadeloupe against Canada
 Fastest dismissal of a substitute: 5 minutes – Henry Medina – Honduras against Guatemala
 Latest dismissal in a match without extra time: 90+3 minutes – Marvin González – El Salvador against Mexico
 Latest dismissal in a match with extra time: 115 minutes – Roger Espinoza – Honduras against Mexico
 Least time difference between two yellow cards given to the same player: 5 minutes – Henry Medina – Honduras against Guatemala (Medina was booked in the 74th minute and again in the 79th resulting in his dismissal.)
 Most yellow cards (team): 15 – Honduras
 Most red cards (team): 3 – Guatemala
 Fewest yellow cards (team): 2 – Cuba
 Most yellow cards (player): 2 – (13 players) Gustavo Cabrera, Henry Medina, Cristian Noriega, Luis Anaya, Roger Espinoza, Carlos Bocanegra, Andrés Guardado, Jermaine Jones, Victor Bernardez, Alfredo Mejía, Efraín Juárez, Javier Portillo, José Salvatierra, Osman Chávez, Rodolph Austin, Stéphane Auvray, Stéphane Zubar, Terry Dunfield (Names in bold indicate 2 yellows in same game.)
 Most red cards (player): 1 – (10 players) Mikael Tacalfred, Jean-Luc Lambourde, Marvin González, Gustavo Cabrera, Henry Medina, Cristian Noriega, Jermaine Taylor, Luis Anaya, Blas Pérez, Roger Espinoza
 Most yellow cards (match): 9 – Honduras vs Mexico
 Most red cards (match): 2 – Panama vs El Salvador
 Fewest yellow cards (match): 0 – Cuba vs Mexico
 Most cards in one match: 9 yellow cards and 1 red card – Honduras vs Mexico

Sanctions

By match
Note: In this table the "Yellow" column counts only the first yellow card given to a player in a match. If a player receives a second yellow in the same match this is counted under "Second yellow". This second yellow is not counted as a "Straight Red".

<small>Cards
Referees

By referee

By team

Cards

References

Disciplinary Record, 2011 Concacaf Gold Cup